Ondřej Ertl (born 22 July 1987 in Klatovy) is a professional squash player who represented Czech Republic. He reached a career-high world ranking of World No. 164 in May 2013.

References

External links 
 
 

Czech male squash players
Living people
1987 births
People from Klatovy
Sportspeople from the Plzeň Region